Massive Theatre Company, also called Massive or Massive Company, is a professional theatre company in Auckland, New Zealand.

The company was formed in 1990 by Samantha Scott, out of what had previously been Maidment Youth Theatre at the University of Auckland. 

In 2004, the company took The Sons of Charlie Paora by Lennie James to the Royal Court Theatre in London.

Through productions like The Sons of Charlie Paora and 2015's The Brave, the company has "brought challenging topics affecting young Polynesians to the stage". It has also provided career development for actors such as Anapela Polataivao and Beulah Koale.

Production history 
In 2011, the company produced the world premiere of a commissioned play by Lennie James, Havoc in the Garden. The play, directed by Sam Scott, was performed at three Auckland venues, the Herald Theatre at the Aotea Centre, Mangere Arts Centre and Takapuna's Pumphouse.

In 2017, the company's The Wholehearted was nominated for the Excellence Award in Ensemble Performance at the Wellington Theatre Awards. The Wholehearted was created as a celebration of Massive Theatre Company's 25th anniversary in 2016. The play was directed by Sam Scott and Scotty Cotter, and featured a cast of seven: Bree Peters, Renee Lyons, Kura Forrester, Pat Tafa, Denyce Su'a, Theo David and Villa Lemanu. It played at Mangere Arts Centre, Q Theatre Loft and Herald Theatre in Auckland, Hannah Playhouse in Wellington and Iona College in Hawkes Bay between March 2016 and September 2017. 

In 2018, the company produced Sightings by Fiona Graham, Miriama McDowell and Denyce Su'a.

References 

Theatre companies in New Zealand
Culture in Auckland
1990 establishments in New Zealand